Static apnea (STA) is a discipline in which a person holds their breath (apnea) underwater for as long as possible, and need not swim any distance.  Static apnea is defined by the International Association for Development of Apnea (AIDA International) and is distinguished from the Guinness World Record for breath holding underwater, which allows the use of oxygen in preparation.  It requires that the respiratory tract be immersed, with the body either in the water or at the surface, and may be performed in a pool or open water (sea, lake, river, etc.).  Static apnea is the only AIDA International discipline measuring duration, and one of the three disciplines considered for the international competitions by team, with constant weight and dynamic with fins.

Beta blockers (doping in sport of freediving; prolong every type of apnea by reducing heart rate, blood pressure and cardiac output) can prolong static apnea for up to 20%.

All time list

Men

* Branko Petrović also has 10:45.0 under CMAS (2017., Subotica, Serbia) and 10:23 under AIDA.** Goran Čolak also has 11:06.14 and 10:19 under special rules at 12th and 11th Fazza freediving competition respectively, in Dubai, UAE.

Women

With pure oxygen – record progression

There is a variation of the static apnea discipline where it's possible to breathe 100% oxygen for up to 30 minutes prior to the breathhold.  This is not part of formal competitions, but is occasionally used to set individual records.

See also
 Shallow water blackout
 Freediving

References

External links
AIDA disciplines definitions
AIDA world records
Are you in the mood for Freediving with Stephane Mifsud ? (W.R static 11'35")
Goran Čolak sets new Guinnrss World Record Breath Hold 22 minutes and 30 seconds